The Cobb Reservoir, surrounded by Kahurangi National Park and fed by the Cobb River, is in the South Island of New Zealand. Cobb Reservoir is the highest hydro storage lake in New Zealand.

The dam that forms the reservoir was built from 1949 to 1954, replacing a smaller structure built about ten years earlier. The geology of the area precluded the construction of a concrete dam.

A narrow winding road leads over Cobb Ridge to Cobb Reservoir and along the lake's shore, providing access to tramping tracks in the area surrounding the valley.  The road was built in the 1940s and remains unsealed from Cobb Power Station onwards.

See also
List of dams and reservoirs in New Zealand

References

External links

Cobb Reservoir at Te Ara: The Encyclopedia of New Zealand

Reservoirs in New Zealand
Landforms of the Tasman District